Chindu may refer to:

Chindu County, in Qinghai, China
one of the divisions of Tamil music in the Pancha Marapu

See also 
 Chindu Bhagavatham, a drama form of Telangana, India
 Qindu District, in Shaanxi, China